Kathrin Marchand (born 15 November 1990) is a German rower. She competed in the women's coxless pair event at the 2016 Summer Olympics, and the women's eight event at the 2012 Summer Olympics.

She was a junior world bronze medallist in the women's eight, and won the bronze medal in the event at the 2014 European Championships.  In 2016, she won a European silver medal in the coxless pair with Kerstin Hartmann.  She competed with Hartmann at the 2016 Summer Olympics.

After suffering a stroke, she took part in the 2022 European Rowing Championships, winning a bronze medal in the pararowing PR3Mix4+ event. In the same class, she won a silver medal in the 2022 World Rowing Championships.

References

External links
 

1990 births
Living people
German female rowers
Olympic rowers of Germany
Rowers at the 2012 Summer Olympics
Rowers at the 2016 Summer Olympics
Rowers from Cologne
European Rowing Championships medalists
21st-century German women